Ahmad al-Sharabati (1909 – 1975) was a Syrian politician and the defense minister of Syria between 1946 and 1948, serving in the post as Syria gained its independence from France and during the early days of the 1948 Arab-Israeli War.

Early life
Sharabati was born in Damascus in 1909, during Ottoman rule. His father, Uthman al-Sharabati, was a well-established merchant and a financier of the nationalist resistance movement against French Mandatory rule, which began in 1920. Ahmad was an engineer by trade, obtaining his graduate degree from the Massachusetts Institute of Technology, after being a student at the American University of Beirut.

Political career

French Mandatory rule
Sharabati returned to Damascus where he operated a tobacco plant and as a representative for General Motors. In 1933, he helped co-found the Arab nationalist and anti-colonial organization, the League of National Action (LNA). The LNA called for the liberation of Arab countries from French and British rule and for the post-colonial economic integration of the Arab world. He left the LNA in 1936 to join the most prominent independence movement in Mandatory Syria, the National Bloc.

Sharabati struck a particular alliance with the National Bloc's Damascus-based leaders, such as Shukri al-Quwatli and Jamil Mardam Bey. Sharabati ran for parliament as a representative of Damascus in 1943, winning the seat. He was appointed by Prime Minister Fares al-Khoury education and national economy minister in March 1945. A year later, Syria gained full independence from France and was appointed defense minister by Prime Minister Saadallah al-Jabiri, despite scant knowledge and experience in military affairs. Sharabati's ally, President Quwatli tasked him to establish the post-independent Syrian Army and was entrusted to win the favor of officers, which he was not able to do successfully.

References

Bibliography

1909 births
1975 deaths
Syrian Arab nationalists
Syrian nationalists
Syrian ministers of defense
Syrian ministers of education
Syrian ministers of economy
National Bloc (Syria) politicians
Syrian people of the 1948 Arab–Israeli War
Arabs from the Ottoman Empire
20th-century Syrian people